On November 16, 2005, the Women's National Basketball Association (WNBA) held an expansion draft for the Chicago Sky.  It was the first expansion draft since the 2000 season, when the WNBA welcomed the Miami Sol, Portland Fire, Indiana Fever, and Seattle Storm into the league.

On April 5, 2006, the WNBA Draft took place at the Boston Convention and Exhibition Center.  The draft was held in conjunction with the 2006 NCAA women's basketball tournament, which had its championship game the night before at the TD Banknorth Garden, now known as TD Garden, in Boston. This marked the first WNBA draft ever held outside New Jersey.

The first round of the draft was televised on ESPN2, while the second and third rounds were shown on ESPNU and NBA TV. Linda Cohn hosted the draft coverage. Four of the top six draft picks would be named to the All-Star Game in their rookie season: Seimone Augustus, Cappie Pondexter, Sophia Young, and Candice Dupree.

Key

Expansion draft

College draft

Round 1

Round 2

Round 3

References

Women's National Basketball Association Draft
draft